Vitse-Admiral Drozd was the third ship of the Project 1134 Berkut Large Anti-submarine Ships (BPK) built for the Soviet Navy, also known as the Kresta I-class or Admiral Zozulya-class guided missile cruisers. The vessel was launched on 18 November 1966 and served with the Baltic Fleet through the 1970s and 1980s. As well as taking part in naval exercises in the Atlantic, the ship assisted in the rescue of the crew of the stricken submarine  in March 1972. Subsequently, the ship was visited by Sergey Gorshkov, commander of the Soviet Navy. The vessel was reclassified a Large Rocket Ship (RKR) in 1977 to reflect its multi-purpose capability. After an upgrade in 1981, Vitse-Admiral Drozd continued to operate in the Mediterranean Sea and Atlantic Ocean until being decommissioned on 1 July 1990. The ship was sent to India to be scrapped in March 1992 but sank en route.

Design and development

Design

Vitse-Admiral Drozd was the third Project 1134 Berkut-class vessel launched. The class were envisioned as a more balanced follow-on to the specialist Project 58 and Project 61 classes, combining the attributes of both in a single hull. Termed Kresta I cruisers by NATO, the class were initially called Large Anti-submarine Ships ( or BPK) but this was changed to Large Rocket Ship (RKR) to reflect their wider role.

The hull was made of steel upon which was mounted a large aluminium-magnesium alloy superstructure dominated by a radar complex including MR-500, MR-310 Angara-A, MRP-11-12, MRP-13-14 Uspekh-U and MRP-15-16 Zaliv search radars and a Volga navigation radar.

Power was provided by two TV-12 steam turbines, fuelled by four KVN-98/64 boilers and driving two fixed pitch screws that provided . Electricity was provided by a TD-760 driven off steam drawn from the main boilers which powered a 380 V AC circuit at a frequency of 50 Hz. Complement was 30 officers and 282 ratings.

Armament
Vitse-Admiral Drozd was originally intended to mount the P-500 Bazalt (NATO reporting name SS-N-12 'Sandbox') but protracted development meant that instead the same 4K44 missiles (SS-N-3 'Shaddock') as the Project 58 warships mounted were retained. However, they were launched from two specially designed twin KT-35-1134 P-35 launchers mounted midships. An aft landing pad and hangar was fitted for a ranging Kamov Ka-25 helicopter to enable mid-course guidance.

Similarly, anti-aircraft defence was to be based around the new M-11 Shtorm (SA-N-3 'Goblet') system but this did not become operational until 1969. Instead, protection was enhanced by mounting two twin ZIF-102 M-1 Volna-M launchers, one forward and the other aft, and up to 64 4K91 (SA-N-1 'Goa') missiles, which was supplemented by two twin  AK-725 guns mounted on the aft superstructure. Fire control was directed by two 4R90 Yatagan units along with Binom-1134, MR-103 Bars, Grozna-1134 and Burya-1134 fire control systems along with an ARP-50R radio direction finder. Two Gurzuf ESM radar systems were fitted along with a ZIF-121 launcher for PK-2 decoy rockets. Threat response was coordinated with a Planshet-1134 combat information control system.

Defence against submarines was provided by two quintuple  PTA-53-1134 torpedo launchers, a pair of six-barrelled RBU-1000 Smerch-3 launchers for  anti-submarine rockets and a pair of twelve-barrelled RBU-6000 Smerch-2 launchers for  anti-submarine rockets. Ten torpedoes, either 53–65, 53-65K or SET-65, were carried. An extensive anti-submarine sensor suite was also fitted, with MG-312M Titan and GAS-311 Vychegda sonars, the MG-26 Khosta underwater communication system and both MI-110R and MI-110K anti-submarine search stations.

Between January 1980 and March 1983, the ship was upgraded with four AK-630 close-in weapon systems, with their attendant fire control radars, installed near the bridge to improve anti-missile defence.

Construction and career
Vitse-Admiral Drozd was approved by Nikita Khrushchev as part of Sergey Gorshkov's buildup of the Soviet Navy. The ship was laid down on 26 October 1965 at A.A. Zhdanov in Leningrad with yard number 793, and launched on 18 November 1966. The total cost of construction was 32 million rubles.

The ship was commissioned on 27 December 1968 and joined the Baltic Fleet as part of the 120th Missile Ship Brigade on 5 May 1969. The ship operated in the Northern Atlantic Ocean in June 1969 and then took part in Kolskiy Bereg between 12 and 15 August 1969 and Okean-70 between 10 March and 22 April 1970. Cruises in 1970 in the Norwegian Sea, Atlantic Ocean and Caribbean Sea included a visit to Cienfuegos, Cuba, between 14 and 25 May; a return visit to Cuba in February 1971 took place as part of further tours of the Atlantic Ocean, Gulf of Mexico, Caribbean Sea and the Mediterranean Sea between 13 January and 28 April 1971.  On 13 April 1971, the vessel tracked a submarine northeast of Ireland, subsequently tracking a NATO task force off the Faroe Islands and participating in the Soviet Orbita exercise.

Vitse-Admiral Drozd crossed the equator for the first time on 17 February 1972 but returned to the Bay of Biscay to take part in the rescue operation for the Project 658 submarine  between 3 and 20 March. The submarine surfaced after a fire broke out on 24 February, killing 28 sailors. Vitse-Admiral Drozd evacuated the survivors, leaving a skeleton crew to bring the boat to port. On 3 May, the ship was visited by Soviet Navy commander Admiral Sergey Gorshkov.

Between 2 September and 2 October 1977, the vessel observed the NATO exercise Strong Express.

On 20 June 1980, the ship's keel was damaged in an accident with Project 670 submarine K-508, which was repaired as part of an overhaul and upgrade that took place at Kronshtadt between January 1981 and March 1983. This cruise included a visit to Dubrovnik between 9 and 13 May. The first half of 1986 was also spent in the Mediterranean, with visits in April to Tripoli and Tobruk.

After over 20 years of service, Vitse-Admiral Drozd was decommissioned on 1 July 1990. The flag was taken down on 2 June 1991 and, in March 1992, the vessel sank while being towed to India to be scrapped.

Pennant numbers

Notes

References

Citations

Bibliography

1966 ships
Kresta I-class cruisers
Ships built at Severnaya Verf
Cold War cruisers of the Soviet Union
Maritime incidents in 1992